Lee Payant (born 1924 in Seattle, Washington – died 14 December 1976 in Paris, France), was an actor and film director also known for voicing the title role of the 1960s TV serial The Adventures of Robinson Crusoe in English.

From 1949 until his death in 1976, he and his musical associate and lover (actor and theatrical director) Gordon Heath ran a cafe and nightclub named L'Abbaye on the Rive Gauche in Paris. Here they both regularly played American and French folk, gospel and blues songs - being the only performers at the Abbaye. L'Abbaye was the namesake of their duet albums titled Songs Of The Abbaye (1954), Encores From The Abbaye (1955), and An Evening at L'Abbaye (1957) on the Elektra label. Payant died of cancer in Paris in 1976.

Filmography

References

External links

Illustrated Gordon Heath & Lee Payant discography

1924 births
1976 deaths
American male film actors
American film directors
20th-century American male actors
Deaths from cancer in France
American gay actors
20th-century LGBT people